The IMF and World Bank meet each autumn in what is officially known as the Annual Meetings of the International Monetary Fund and the World Bank Group and each spring in the Spring Meetings of the International Monetary Fund and the World Bank Group. Names of the two groups are alternated each year so a different one has top billing.

The autumn meetings are customarily held in Washington, D.C., United States for two consecutive years, and in another member country in the third year. At the spring and annual meetings there are meetings of the World Bank-IMF Development Committee and the International Monetary and Financial Committee (IMFC). Each committee is made of up ministers or central bank governors. There are equivalent numbers and the same constituency systems as is used at the Executive boards of the institutions. At the annual meetings, the governors of the World Bank and IMF also meet in plenary sessions.

Until the 2008 financial crisis, both the spring and annual meetings were preceded by meetings of the G7 finance ministers. Amid an unfolding global financial crisis, for the first time the 2008 annual meetings included a meeting of G20 finance ministers. The 2009 annual meetings witnessed the last meetings of the G7 finance ministers, with all future spring and annual meetings accompanied by G20 finance minister meetings. The spring and annual meetings also include meetings of the finance ministers of the G-24 group of developing countries.

Since the mid-1990s, these meetings have centerpoints for anti-globalization movement protests.  There have been complete bans on outdoor protests in the 2003 meetings in Dubai, United Arab Emirates as well as the 2006 meeting in Singapore, where only indoor demonstrations within a designated area is permitted.  Some argue that such bans are out of safety concerns, while others consider them an effort to curb dissent. These measures have led to retaliatory actions by NGOs who targeted the organisers, as well as the IMF and World Bank for allegedly picking venues which are known to impose such restrictions.

List of Annual Meetings

See also 

 1988 IMF/World Bank protests

References

External links
 https://meetings.imf.org/en/Index
 https://web.archive.org/web/20151016012939/https://www.2015lima.gob.pe/en/

World Bank Group
International conferences
International Monetary Fund
20th-century diplomatic conferences
21st-century diplomatic conferences
Global economic conferences